"The Day the Rains Came" or "Am Tag als der Regen kam" or "La pioggia cadrà" is an adaptation of the French song "Le jour où la pluie viendra". The latter is a popular song released in 1957,  composed and written by Gilbert Bécaud and Pierre Delanoë.

Bécaud's version reached #3 in Wallonia, in a tandem ranking, and #20 in Flanders. 

In the United Kingdom, an English version by Jane Morgan went to number one in 1958. That version also reached #4 in Canada and #7 in Norway.

In US, Raymond Lefèvre was first to release the song but only as instrumental under the English name. Lefèvre, Morgan and Dalida were tandemly ranked #14 (Billboard) and #17 (Cash Box), while Lefèvre's and Morgan's versions were marked as bestsellers on both charts (Dalida never recorded the song in English, only her French language original was released in US under the English name). "The day the rains came" also reached #2 on Billboard's sheet music chart.

Many covers exist. In French by Les Compagnons de la chanson, Guylaine Guy, Nicole Félix, Jane Morgan, Aïda Aznavour, Claude Luter, Jean Bertola, Philippe Andrey etc. In Italian, as "La pioggia cadrà" with lirycs by Mario Panzeri, by Betty Curtis, Anita Traversi, Nilla Pizzi, Dalida etc.

Dalida's version 

Dalida's version was also an international success. She recorded it for the first time in 1957 and was among the first places in the rankings in France where the song was released on the A side of a 45 rpm maxi with "Gondolier". Also the song was a #1 hit in Germany and a major success of her career with more than 1,000,000 units sold worldwide. On July 15, 1959, the German music magazine Musikmarkt was published with Dalida on the cover. The magazine judged Dalida's hit as "a won battle for the cultivated, sophisticated hit". 

Dalida was credited in 1984 as créatrice de la chanson − expression used in France for the original performer.

Charts

References 

1957 songs
1957 singles
1958 singles
1959 singles
French songs
German songs
Dalida songs
Gilbert Bécaud songs
Songs with music by Gilbert Bécaud
Songs written by Pierre Delanoë
Songs with lyrics by Ernst Bader
Jane Morgan songs
Songs written by Carl Sigman
UK Singles Chart number-one singles
London Records singles